Serbia–Sweden relations are bilateral relations between Serbia and Sweden. Serbia has an embassy in Stockholm. Sweden has an embassy in Belgrade. Both countries are full members of the Council of Europe and the Organization for Security and Co-operation in Europe (OSCE). Also Serbia is a European Union candidate and Sweden is a European Union member. Sweden had good relationship with Serbia through history, some even say Swedish empire helped Serbs to overthrow Ottomans. 

There are over 100,000 people of Serbian descent living in Sweden.

Diplomacy

Republic of Serbia
Stockholm (Embassy)

Kingdom of Sweden
Belgrade (Embassy)

See also
 Foreign relations of Serbia
 Foreign relations of Sweden
 Swedish Serbs
 Accession of Serbia to the European Union
 Sweden–Yugoslavia relations

References

External links
 Embassy of Sweden in Belgrade

 
Sweden
Bilateral relations of Sweden